By-elections were held in Punjab, Pakistan on 17 July 2022 to elect 20 members of the Provincial Assembly of the Punjab. The Pakistan Tehreek-e-Insaf won a landslide victory on 15 of those 20 seats, leading to the collapse of Chief Minister Hamza Shahbaz's PML(N)-led coalition government, as it became 7 seats short of a majority.

The by-elections were held on these seats: PP-7 (Rawalpindi-II), PP-83 (Khushab-II), PP-90 (Bhakkar-II), PP-97 (Faisalabad-I), PP-125 (Jhang-II), PP-127 (Jhang-IV), PP-140 (Sheikhupura-VI), PP-158 (Lahore-XV), PP-167 (Lahore-XXIV), PP-168 (Lahore-XXV), PP-170 (Lahore-XXVII), PP-202 (Sahiwal-VII), PP-217 (Multan-VII), PP-224 (Lodhran-I), PP-228 (Lodhran-V), PP-237 (Bahawalnagar-I), PP-272 (Muzaffargarh-V), PP-273 (Muzaffargarh-VI), PP-282 (Layyah-III) and PP-288 (Dera Ghazi Khan-IV).

In the 2018 election, 11 of these seats were won by Independents, 8 were won by candidates on the PTI-ticket, and 1 by a PML(N) candidate; the 11 independents all subsequently joined the PTI and the PML(N) seat was won by the PTI in a 2018 by-election. The by-elections were triggered after these 20 PTI MPAs voted in favor of the opposition candidate belonging to the PML(N), Hamza Shahbaz, to become the Chief Minister of Punjab, which violated Article 63-A of the Constitution of Pakistan according to the Supreme Court and the Election Commission of Pakistan in regards to defecting from a party.

Background 

After the 2018 Provincial Elections, Pakistan Tehreek-e-Insaf (PTI) won 159 seats and Pakistan Muslim League (N) (PML(N)) won 164 seats. Soon after, 25 out of 30 Independents joined PTI, but it was still 2 seats short of a majority of 186. Pakistan Muslim League (Q) (PML(Q)) with 10 seats formed alliance with PTI. PTI was able to form government in Punjab.

During a political crisis in Pakistan after the successful no-confidence motion against Prime Minister Imran Khan, another motion of no confidence was filed against Chief Minister Usman Buzdar, as well as against Chaudhry Pervaiz Elahi and Dost Muhammad Mazari, the Speaker and Deputy Speaker of the Provincial Assembly, respectively. Buzdar resigned before a vote on the motion of no confidence could be held and as a consequence, an election for a new Chief Minister was scheduled on 16 April between PML(N)'s Hamza Shahbaz, the joint candidate of the Pakistan Democratic Movement, and PML(Q)'s Chaudhry Pervaiz Elahi, the joint candidate of his party and PTI. On the day of the election, 25 PTI MPAs crossed the floor to support Shahbaz, violating party policy. During the very beginning of the Assembly session on 16 April, a riot began between PTI and PML-N supporters. PTI MPAs threw ewers at the Deputy Speaker, as well as slapping him. The police entered the Assembly for the first time in its history and arrested 3 MPAs. The Deputy Speaker then presided over the Assembly session in the visitors gallery and declared Shahbaz the winner by securing 197 votes.

After the floor crossing, the Election Commission of Pakistan (ECP) de-seated 25 dissident PTI MPAs for defection in the light of Article 63-A of the Constitution of the Islamic Republic of Pakistan on 20 May 2022. Five of these MPAs were elected on reserved seats (3 for women and two for minorities) and new PTI MPAs were notified on these seats on 7 July.

The ECP announced on 25 May 2022 that the by-elections would be held on 17 July 2022. The government held 177 seats in the assembly. This included 165 PML(N) MPAs, 7 PPP MPAs, 1 PRHP MPA, and 4 independent MPAs. Therefore, they needed to win 9 seats to gain a majority in the assembly. On the other hand, the opposition held 173 seats. This included 163 PTI MPAs and 10 PML(Q) MPAs. Therefore, they needed to win 13 seats to gain a majority in the assembly.

Candidates 

A total number of 330 candidates filed nominations for the 20 constituencies. The major contest was between Pakistan Tehreek-e-Insaf and Pakistan Muslim League (N). The Pakistan Peoples Party (PPP) withdrew its candidates in favor of PML(N) whereas PML-Q withdrew its candidates in favor of PTI.

The nominations of 175 candidates were accepted from across Punjab and they contested in these by-elections. 3,131 Polling Stations were created in 20 Constituencies out of which 731 were for men, 700 for women, and 1700 were combined polling stations. The ECP declared 1304 polling stations sensitive and 690 highly sensitive. All polling stations from the 4 constituencies of Lahore and the constituency of Multan were declared sensitive.

Results

Result by Constituency

Constituency-wise Detailed Result 
Detailed results of each constituency are as follows:

PP-7 Rawalpindi

PP-83 Khushab

PP-90 Bhakkar

PP-97 Faisalabad

PP-125 Jhang

PP-127 Jhang

PP-140 Sheikhupura

PP-158 Lahore

PP-167 Lahore

PP-168 Lahore

PP-170 Lahore

PP-202 Sahiwal

PP-217 Multan

PP-224 Lodhran

PP-228 Lodhran

PP-237 Bahawalnagar

PP-272 Muzaffargarh

PP-273 Muzaffargarh

PP-282 Layyah

PP-288 Dera Ghazi Khan

Aftermath 
In the aftermath of the by-election, it was claimed that PTI MPA from PP-257 (Rahim Yar Khan-II), Chaudhry Masood Ahmad had become a turncoat after his loyalty was allegedly bought, whereafter he soon fled to Turkey. Allegations of rigging were also put forward by PTI in the PP-7 (Rawalpindi-II) constituency, where the PML(N) candidate emerged as the victor with a margin of 49 votes. A plea for a recount was also presented, which was subsequently rejected by the ECP. 2 PML(N) MPAs, Faisal Niazi from PP-209 (Khanewal-VII) and Jaleel Ahmed Sharaqpuri from PP-139 (Sheikhupura-V), also resigned from their seats before the election for Chief Minister.

Election for Chief Minister 
The election for Chief Minister took place on 22 July 2022 among members of the Provincial Assembly. Controversially, the votes of ten PML(Q) MPAs were rejected by Deputy Speaker Dost Muhammad Mazari, citing an interpretation of Article 63A of the Constitution and a letter from the leader Shujaat Hussain stating he had "issued directions to all my provincial members to cast their votes in favour of Muhammad Hamza Shahbaz Sharif". This resulted in a majority of valid votes, 179, for Hamza Shahbaz to Pervaiz Elahi's 176. Article 63A states:

The PTI filed a petition with the Supreme Court of Pakistan, stating that as PML(Q) leader Hussain was not a member of the Punjab Assembly, he did not have the authority to make the decision to back Shahbaz under section 2 of the constitutional article cited, as only the Parliamentary Party has the authority to decide which candidate its members are to vote for. Additionally, under a 17 May Supreme Court ruling, although defecting lawmakers' votes will not be counted for purposes of voting in Article 63A, section 1, subsection b, none of the 10 PML(Q) members had been deemed to have defected, as that would have required a letter stating as such from the leader, which was Shujaat Hussain. As a consequence of the court proceedings, Shahbaz was made a “trustee Chief Minister” until the three-judge bench of Chief Justice Umar Ata Bandial, Justice Munib Akhtar, and Justice Ijaz-ul-Ahsan, could reach a decision.

The bench ruled on 26 July that the Deputy Speaker's ruling was unconstitutional and that Chaudhry Pervaiz Elahi would be sworn in as the Chief Minister of Punjab.

References 

Election and referendum articles with incomplete results
2022 elections in Pakistan
2018
July 2022 events in Pakistan